"All Hands on Deck" is a song recorded by American singer Tinashe for her debut studio album, Aquarius (2014). It was written by Tinashe, Bebe Rexha, Stargate, and Cashmere Cat, and produced by the latter two. A crunk&B song, "All Hands on Deck" contains a prominent pan flute breakdown, a thick bassline and "club-friendly" beat, and has been described as the "sister song" to the album's lead single "2 On" (2014). The track's lyrical content comprises a dance instructional and portrays a scenario of retaining confidence, and rebound dating after a break-up, and contain themes of girl power and self empowerment. On February 22, 2015, a remix version of the song premiered online featuring Australian rapper Iggy Azalea, and received a digital-only release on February 24. Serving as the third single from Aquarius, it impacted urban contemporary radio and was released as a digital download in the United States on February 24, 2015.

The song garnered positive reviews from music critics who commended its club appeal and Tinashe's vocals, while also naming it as a highlight on the album. Azalea's verse on the promotional remix version was also well-received, with critics opining that her addition was beneficial for the track's airplay prospects. Tinashe has performed "All Hands on Deck" for radio stations KPWR and Nova 106.9, and as part of her set list for her Aquarius Tour (2014–15).

Background
"All Hands on Deck" was written by Tinashe, Bebe Rexha, Stargate and Cashmere Cat, and produced by the latter two. Stargate and Cashmere Cat were also responsible for the track's instrumentation and programming, while the former recorded the song with Tinashe at DownTown Studios in New York City. "All Hands on Deck" was then mixed by Phil Tan at the Ninja Club in Atlanta, Georgia, and mastered by Dave Kutch at The Mastering Palace, New York City. Other personnel involved included Tim Blacksmith and Danny D. as executive producers, and Daniela Rivera as an assistant engineer. The song's title was first revealed in the announcement of the Aquarius track listing on August 27, 2014. Tinashe then uploaded the original version of "All Hands on Deck" to her SoundCloud page along with the rest of the album on September 30, 2014. Rexha announced the song's single release on January 23, 2015, on Snapchat. On February 9, 2015, Tinashe announced that the single's release will be accompanied by a new version of the song which will contain a new verse from a guest feature. In an interview with WZMX, she stated, "I wanted to put out something that's a little fresh, because the song has been on the album for a few months, so I wanted to give somebody a brand new verse, a little something-something".

On February 21, 2015, Tinashe posted the single's cover art on her Instagram account. A remix version of "All Hands on Deck" was premiered by Perez Hilton on February 22, 2015, featuring Australian rapper Iggy Azalea rapping the song's new verse. The official remix was released as a promotional single for The Great Escape Tour, that both Azalea and Tinashe were scheduled to be a part of during the Spring 2015. It received its radio premiere on WZMX on February 23, 2015. Serving as the third single from Aquarius, it impacted urban contemporary radio and was released as a digital download in the United States on February 24, 2015. "All Hands on Deck" was commercially released in the United Kingdom on April 19, 2015. Another remix featuring DeJ Loaf was released on June 8, 2015.

Composition

"All Hands on Deck" is a crunk&B song which contains elements of West Coast hip hop, grime and late 1990s-early 2000s R&B. It comprises a thick bassline, "club-friendly" beat, thudding synthesizers and a pan flute breakdown. Noted to be a shift from more sweet and coy-sounding tracks on Aquarius, Tinashe solicits a snarling technique in her vocal delivery, together with a more upbeat attitude and in contrast with Azalea's braggadocio. On the promotional remix single, Azalea's rapped verse occurs halfway through the song's duration, at its bridge, with the rapper announcing herself as "Iggs". Described as the "sister song" to Aquarius lead single "2 On", "All Hands on Deck" also garnered comparisons to Cassie's "Long Way 2 Go" (2006), Ying Yang Twins' "Whistle While You Twurk" (2000), and the works of DJ Mustard. While Azalea's verse was noted to recall her single "Fancy" (2014).

The song's lyrical content was noted to combine a dance instructional with the subject of caustic post-break-up stunting, namely in the lyric, "Kiss the old me goodbye / She's dead and gone". It portrays a scenario of a woman retaining her confidence and embracing her love life after a break-up. Iyana Robinson of Vibe viewed the track as a "good-girl-gone-bad anthem," in which Tinashe and Azalea are "bossy and sexed-up". The track also discusses rebound dating, manifested in the lyrics, "When you left, you left me with no choice / I'm looking for a boy to fill this empty void". While Azalea's verse describes the scenario where a new lover finds interest in her style and prowess, "Every night, a different city, different time zone / All I wanna do is get my shine in / Far as fashion and this rappin', I'm who run it now / Walk-throughs cost a hundred thou/ Yo, I'm Iggy, ow". The lyrics were also noted to contain themes of girl power and self empowerment.

Critical reception
"All Hands on Deck" garnered critical acclaim from music critics. Aimee Cliff of Fact said the track was "another bouncy club banger" from the singer. Alex Macpherson of The Quietus called it "irresistible". Exclaim! writer Jabbari Weekes said that while the song's title depicts a "buzzword for a sea foraging adventure," its "water-inspired" motif added cohesiveness and helped entice listeners on the album. Bradley Stern of MuuMuse wrote that the track provided a "truly nasty, finger-snapping alarm call for the dancefloor," and commended its "powerhouse" chorus, and flute instrumentation. Stern went on to comment, "If the 'flute chorus' is the new horn chorus' in pop in 2015, you can peg Tinashe as the trailblazer for the movement". In a review of Aquarius, Pitchfork Media's Meaghan Garvey deemed "All Hands on Deck" the album's "sole answer to the club-readiness of '2 On'". Writing for Complex, Garvey named it the highlight on Aquarius and commented, "how can you go wrong with ratchet pan flutes?". Similarly, Forrest Wickman of Slate opined that it was the sole track on Aquarius that came closest to the "intoxicating heights" of "2 On". "All Hands on Deck" was also  called "the standout cut" on the album by Nolan Feeney of Time.

Natalie Weiner of Pigeons & Planes deemed "All Hands on Deck" a "stellar" track and commended Tinashe's "smooth" vocals. Music Times writer Ryan Middleton viewed it as one of the "vastly underrated" tracks on the album and opined that Azalea's verse should assist it in receiving "the shine it deserved in the first place". HotNewHipHop's Trevor Smith wrote that Azalea's verse "bolstered" the song and that its airplay would benefit from it as a result. Similarly, Maurice Bobb of MTV News called Azalea's verse "catchy," and said that the single had "the sonic fuel to really set the charts on fire" and match the success of "2 On". Fuse's Jeff Benjamin wrote that Azalea's braggadocio meshed well with Tinashe's empowering lyrics on "All Hands on Deck," and concluded that the track became one of 2015's "first awesome girl-power anthems" and was "in prime position to become a hit".

The New York Times writer Jon Caramanica described "All Hands on Deck" as a "high-quality copy" of "2 On" and one of the album's "knowing ploys". In a negative review, Slant Magazine's Sal Cinquemani said the song sounded "utterly generic" in comparison with other tracks on Aquarius. While Reed Jackson of XXL called the track "flimsy" and felt Tinashe's vocal was buried "underneath a stew of seemingly every sound DJ Mustard has introduced to the hip-hop world to over the past two years".

Live performances
Tinashe has stated that the track is among her favorite songs to perform live, along with "2 On" and "Bated Breath". She first performed "All Hands on Deck" in an in-studio live rendition for KPWR on October 14, 2014. Tinashe later sang the track at the iHeartMedia Music Summit on January 21, 2015, and reprised it in a performance for Australian radio station Nova 106.9 on February 20, 2015. "All Hands on Deck" was also performed as part of Tinashe's set list for her Aquarius Tour (2014–15). In a review of the tour's stop at Rams Head Live!, Rated R&B's Keithan Samuels said the singer "lit up the stage with her electrifying dance moves" during her rendition of the song. Tinashe and Iggy Azalea performed the remix version of the track for the first time at the Washington State Fair on September 22, 2015.

Music video
On March 11, 2015,  an official lyric video for the remix version of the song premiered on Tinashe's Vevo account. On the same day, Tinashe confirmed during an interview with FunX FM in Amsterdam that a music video for the song had just been shot and she was "really excited." On March 24, 2015, she shared a sneak peek with Style.com/Arabia saying, "the music video is coming out very soon, so definitely be on the lookout for that. It’s my second single and I’m really excited to share a sneak peek with you." On April 3, 2015, Tinashe announced through her Facebook account that the video would premiere on the following Monday, April 6, and shared a photo diary from the video shoot on the same day with Paper. The official music video for the song (directed by Ben Mor) was filmed at a shipyard in Long Beach, California and premiered on April 6, 2015. Azalea later revealed she was meant to appear in the visuals but could not make the shoot date.

Track listing
Digital download
"All Hands on Deck (Remix)"  – 3:40

Digital download
"All Hands on Deck (Remix)"  – 4:00

Digital download
"All Hands on Deck" [Album track] – 3:41

Credits and personnel
Recording locations
Recorded at DownTown Studios, New York City
Mixed at Ninja Beat Club, Atlanta, Georgia
Mastered at The Mastering Palace, New York City

Personnel

Tinashe – songwriter, lead vocals
Iggy Azalea - songwriter, lead vocals
Stargate – songwriter, producer, all instruments, programming, recording
Cashmere Cat – songwriter, producer, all instruments, programming
Bebe Rexha – songwriter
Phil Tan – mixing
Daniela Rivera – additional engineering
Tim Blacksmith – executive producer
Danny D. – executive producer
Dave Kutch – mastering

Credits adapted from the liner notes of Aquarius.

Charts

Weekly charts

Year-end charts

Certifications

Release history

References

External links
 
 

Crunk songs
2014 songs
2015 singles
Iggy Azalea songs
RCA Records singles
Song recordings produced by Stargate (record producers)
Songs with feminist themes
Songs written by Bebe Rexha
Songs written by Cashmere Cat
Songs written by Mikkel Storleer Eriksen
Songs written by Tinashe
Songs written by Tor Erik Hermansen
Tinashe songs
Song recordings produced by Cashmere Cat